Pruitt Taylor Vince (born July 5, 1960) is an American character actor. He became best known for his roles in the films Shy People (1987) and Mississippi Burning (1988). He also appeared in Jacob's Ladder (1990), Nobody's Fool (1994), Heavy (1995), Beautiful Girls (1996), The Legend of 1900 (1998), Nurse Betty (2000), Identity (2003), Constantine (2005), Gotti (2018), and Bird Box (2018). He is also known for his role of J.J. Laroche in The Mentalist (2008–2015).

Vince has also appeared on many television series. In 1997, he won a Primetime Emmy Award for his guest role as Clifford Banks in the second season of the television series Murder One.

Early life
Vince was born in Baton Rouge, Louisiana. He reportedly began studying acting due to a mistake; a computer error in his high school registration scheduled him in an acting class, and he decided to stay. He attended Louisiana State University. 

For most of his life, Vince has had a condition called nystagmus which is the involuntary movement of the eye. He has tried to incorporate it into his roles.

Career
Vince made his film debut in Jim Jarmusch's Down by Law, but his scenes were edited out. He had prominent supporting roles in a number of major films, including a turn as a dimwitted Ku Klux Klan member in Mississippi Burning (1988), Lee Bowers in JFK (1991), and the main character's best friend in Nobody's Fool (1994). His first lead role was in James Mangold's independent film Heavy (1995), playing a sweet, silent overweight cook harboring a crush on a waitress played by Liv Tyler. He also starred in Giuseppe Tornatore's Italian film Legend of 1900 (1998). 
 
Vince often alternates between heroic and villainous characters. He played a lovable, small town pub owner in Beautiful Girls, a serial killer with multiple personalities in Identity (a second collaboration with director Mangold); a priest with psychic abilities in the 2005 film Constantine, a gossip columnist in Simone, and a pompous sheriff in Nurse Betty. He can also be seen in Love from Ground Zero as Walter.  Vince played a Southern policeman in Angel Heart, a kidnapper's assistant in Trapped, and a deputy prison warden in Oliver Stone's Natural Born Killers.

Other film titles include the neo-noir China Moon and the psychological horror film Jacob's Ladder.

Guest appearances on TV shows include Deadwood, Alias, The X-Files, Miami Vice, Quantum Leap, Chicago Hope, In the Heat of the Night, CSI: Crime Scene Investigation, Highlander: The Series, and the American remake of Touching Evil. In 2011, he appeared as Otis in the AMC television series The Walking Dead. He also had a guest role playing a 600-lb. patient in Fox's medical drama House. From 2010 to 2014, he had a multi-episode appearance in The Mentalist. In 2012, he appeared in a full episode of Justified. He took a comic role as "Jelly" in Flypaper. In 2018, he appeared on an episode of The Blacklist as Lawrence Devlin.

Awards
Vince received an Emmy Award in 1997 for Outstanding Guest Actor in a Drama Series for his role as serial killer Clifford Banks during the second season of the television series Murder One.

Filmography

Film

Television

References

External links
 

1960 births
20th-century American male actors
21st-century American male actors
American male film actors
American male television actors
Primetime Emmy Award winners
Living people
Louisiana State University alumni
Male actors from Baton Rouge, Louisiana